Roaring Brook flows into the Black River near Martinsburg, New York.

References 

Rivers of Lewis County, New York